Forst may refer to:

Communities

In Germany
, in the district of Aachen
Forst (Baden), in Baden-Württemberg
Forst (Lausitz), in Brandenburg
Forst (Unterfranken), part of Schonungen, Bavaria
Forst, Altenkirchen, in the district of Altenkirchen, Rhineland-Palatinate
Forst (Eifel), in the district Cochem-Zell, Rhineland-Palatinate
Forst (Hunsrück), in the district Cochem-Zell, Rhineland-Palatinate
Forst an der Weinstraße, in the district of Bad Dürkheim, Rhineland-Palatinate
Forst, Lower Saxony, a district of Bevern, known for its residents Roedelius and Moebius in the 1970s

In Italy
 Forst (Foresta), a frazione in the comune of Algund (Lagundo) in South Tyrol, Italy

In Switzerland
Forst, Switzerland, in the Canton of Bern

People
 David Forst (born 1976), American baseball executive
Grete Forst (1878–1942), Austrian soprano
Rainer Forst (born 1964), German philosopher
Willi Forst (1903–1980), Austrian actor, screenwriter, film director, film producer and singer

Other uses
 Forst (brewery), a brewing company from Forst (Foresta) in South Tyrol, Italy
 Forst, an album by the Austrian slowcore band Mimi Secue released 2004